Rennie is a surname and a given name. It may also refer to:

Places

 Rennie, New South Wales, Australia, a small town
 Rennie, Manitoba, Canada, a community in the Rural Municipality of Reynolds
 Rennie Lake, Michigan, United States
 Rennie Island, Washington, United States
 Rennie, Cork, once the home of Edmund Spenser, now in ruins
 Mount Rennie, Anvers Island in the Palmer Archipelago, off Antarctica

Other uses
 Rennie Football Club, an Australian rules football club in Rennie, New South Wales
 Rennie v. Klein, US legal case about mental illness
 Rennie Memorial Medal, an Australian annual chemical science award
 Bayer's own branded antacid tablets

See also
 John Rennie High School, Quebec, Canada
 Rennie Memorial Presbyterian Church, Amelia, VA
 Ren (disambiguation)
 Renn (disambiguation)